John Haitrosene "Hitro" Okesene (born 22 September 1970), also known by the nickname of "Nitro", is a former professional rugby league footballer who played in the 1990s and 2000s and represented three countries; Western Samoa, American Samoa and New Zealand.

Background
He was born in Auckland, New Zealand.

His brother Paul also played international rugby league.

Playing career
His early years saw him play in both Auckland competitions, for the Manukau club, and for Carlisle in the English competition during the New Zealand off-season. In 1994 he captained the Counties Manukau Heroes in the Lion Red Cup, and in 1995 was part of the inaugural Auckland Warriors squad.  He stayed with Auckland for another two seasons before moving the England to play in the Super League. He played for both the Hull Sharks and the Featherstone Rovers before settling at lower division club, Workington Town. There, as in Auckland, he became a cult figure.

Representative career
Okesene was a Junior Kiwi in 1988 and 1989. In 1988 he also represented Western Samoa in the Pacific Cup. He later represented American Samoa at the 1992 Pacific Cup alongside his brother Paul.

Retirement
In 2003 he retired due to knee troubles and became coach of the Ellenborough Rangers who competed in the Cumbria Amateur Rugby League. He was replaced in 2005 but remains in Cumbria, working in the construction industry.

Personal life
Now residing in Cumbria Okesene lives with his wife, Donna and they have three children named Shakayla, Giovanna and Lerocco

References

1970 births
Living people
American Samoa national rugby league team players
Auckland rugby league team players
Carlisle RLFC players
Counties Manukau rugby league team players
Featherstone Rovers players
Hull F.C. players
Junior Kiwis players
Manukau Magpies players
New Zealand builders
New Zealand people of American Samoan descent
New Zealand sportspeople of Samoan descent
New Zealand national rugby league team players
New Zealand rugby league coaches
New Zealand rugby league players
New Zealand Warriors players
New Zealand people of Niuean descent
Rugby league props
Rugby league hookers
Rugby league players from Auckland
Samoa national rugby league team players
XIII Catalan players
Workington Town players